Illusions is a 1930 French silent comedy film directed by Lucien Mayrargue and starring Pierre Batcheff, Mary Serta and Esther Kiss. It was released at a time when sound films were becoming dominant, and received bad reviews.

Cast
 Pierre Batcheff 
 Mary Serta
 Esther Kiss 
 Gaston Jacquet 
 Jean Joris
 Pola Illéry
 Ninon Bernard

References

Bibliography 
 Powrie, Phil & Rebillard, Éric. Pierre Batcheff and stardom in 1920s French cinema. Edinburgh University Press, 2009

External links 
 

1930 films
French silent feature films
1930s French-language films
French comedy films
1930 comedy films
French black-and-white films
Silent comedy films
1930s French films